The 2nd Infantry Brigade (later 2 (South East) Brigade) was a regional brigade of the British Army, active since before the First World War. It was the regional formation of the Army in the South East of England–the Brigade commanded and administered soldiers throughout Kent, Surrey and Sussex–but also Brunei. In December 2014 the Brigade merged with 145 (South) Brigade to form Headquarters 11th Infantry Brigade and Headquarters South East.

Early history
Following the end of the Second Boer War in 1902 the army was restructured, and the 2nd Infantry Brigade was established as part of the 1st Division in the 1st Army Corps, stationed at Aldershot Garrison.

First World War

The brigade, initially commanded by Brigadier-General Edward Bulfin, served with the 1st Division during the First World War, from 1914 to 1918 and served throughout the war on the Western Front as part of the British Expeditionary Force (BEF). The brigade fought in many of the major battles of the war, first fighting at Mons where they were forced to retreat, and later the First Battle of Ypres, the Second Battle of Ypres and later the Battle of the Somme and Battle of Passchendaele, the German spring offensive and the Hundred Days Offensive.

Order of Battle
The 2nd Brigade was constituted as follows during the war:
 2nd Battalion, Royal Sussex Regiment
 1st Battalion, Loyal Regiment (North Lancashire) (left February 1918)
 1st Battalion, Northamptonshire Regiment
 2nd Battalion, King's Royal Rifle Corps
 1/5th (Cinque Ports) Battalion, Royal Sussex Regiment (from February to August 1915)
 1/9th Battalion, King's Regiment (Liverpool) (from March to November 1915)
 1/5th Battalion, King's Own Royal Regiment (Lancaster) (from October 1915 until January 1916)
 2nd Machine Gun Company, Machine Gun Corps (formed 26 January 1916, moved to 1st Battalion, Machine Gun Corps 28 February 1918)
 2nd Trench Mortar Battery (formed 27 November 1915)

Commanders
The following officers commanded 2nd Brigade during the First World War:
 Brigadier-General E. S. Bulfin (At mobilization)
 Colonel C. Cunliffe-Owen (10 November 1914 - acting)
 Brigadier-General C. B. Westmacott (23 November 1914)
 Brigadier-General G. H. Thesiger (5 May 1915)
 Brigadier-General J. H. W. Pollard (22 August 1915)
 Brigadier-General H. F. Thuillier (5 October 1915)
 Brigadier-General A. B. Hubback (10 March 1916)
 Brigadier-General G. C. Kemp (6 July 1917)
 Lieutenant-Colonel R. Bellamy (2 March 1918 - acting)
 Brigadier-General Sir W. A. I. Kay, Bt. (5 March 1918)
 Lieutenant-Colonel R. Bellamy (17 March 1918 - acting)
 Lieutenant-Colonel G. St. G. Robinson (21 March 1918 - acting)
 Brigadier-General G. C. Kelly (23 March 1918)
 Lieutenant-Colonel D. S. Johnson (26 September 1918 - acting)
 Brigadier-General G. C. Kelly (21 November 1918)

Second World War

During the Second World War the 2nd Infantry Brigade saw active service in many of the major campaigns that the British Army fought in, from France with the BEF to Tunisia in North Africa and finally Italy and saw some extremely hard fighting at the Battle of Anzio where, during a German counterattack, the brigade was surrounded and nearly destroyed. In April 1943, during the fighting in Tunisia, Lieutenant Willward Alexander Sandys-Clarke of the 1st Battalion, Loyal Regiment (North Lancashire) was posthumously awarded the brigades' only Victoria Cross (VC) of the war.

Order of battle
The 2nd Infantry Brigade was constituted as follows during the war:
 1st Battalion, Loyal Regiment (North Lancashire)
 2nd Battalion, North Staffordshire Regiment
 1st Battalion, Gordon Highlanders (left 7 March 1940)
 2nd Infantry Brigade Anti-Tank Company (formed 3 September 1939, disbanded 28 December 1940)
 6th Battalion, Gordon Highlanders (from 7 March 1940)

Commanders
The following officers commanded 2nd Infantry Brigade during the war:
 Brig. Charles Hudson; 1938 - 1940
 Brig. Arthur Dowler; 1940 - 1941
 Brig. Eric Edward James Moore; 1941 - 1944
 Brig. Adrian Clements Gore; 1944
 Brig. Charles Edward Anson Firth; 1944
 Brig. Richard Neville Anderson; 1944 - 1945

Post-Second World War
The brigade was reformed as a regional brigade by the 1980s.

In the House of Commons on 8 January 2002 the Secretary of State for Defence said that "The two light infantry brigade headquarters (52 Lowland) Brigade and 2 (South East) Brigade) are being re-roled from regional brigade headquarters to provide better command and control arrangements for the light infantry role battalions, all of which are currently deployable. Thus the reorganisation of the two brigades will not result in an increase in the number of deployable troops. The change will bring greater coherence to the way that these units prepare for operations, through improved co-ordination of training".

Following broad reorganisation under the Future Army Structures, 2nd Infantry Brigade was renamed 2nd (South East) Brigade in 2007. The name was in line with its revised role as a Regional Brigade, responsible largely for Territorial Army units. The brigade became part of the United Kingdom's Support Command as the 2nd (South East) Brigade. It was not listed under the Army 2020 plan. In December 2014 the Brigade merged with 145 (South) Brigade to form Headquarters 11th Infantry Brigade and Headquarters South East.

References

External links
 2 (South East) Brigade - on British Army official website
 Official site for the Princess of Wales's Royal Regiment (The Tigers)
 Official site for 103 Battalion REME (V)
 Official site for the Royal Gurkha Rifles
 The British Army in Brunei - official website
 

Infantry brigades of the British Army
Infantry brigades of the British Army in World War I
Infantry brigades of the British Army in World War II
Military units and formations established in 1908
Military units and formations disestablished in 2014